Platanthera transversa is a species of orchid known by the common names royal rein orchid and flat spurred piperia.

It is native to western North America from British Columbia to California, where it can be found in forest, woodland, chaparral, and scrub habitat, often in dry areas.

Description 
This orchid grows erect to about 55 centimeters in maximum height from a bulbous caudex. The basal leaves are up to 19 centimeters long by 4 wide. Leaves higher on the stem are much reduced.

The upper part of the stem is a spikelike inflorescence of many flowers which are white or yellowish with green veining. They are fragrant in the evenings and are said to have a scent like cloves.

They are pollinated by geometrid moths.

References

External links 
 
 
 
 
 Jepson Manual Treatment — Piperia transversa
 USDA Plants Profile
 Piperia transversa — U.C. Photo gallery

transversa
Orchids of Canada
Orchids of the United States
Orchids of California
Flora of the West Coast of the United States
Flora of British Columbia
Flora of Oregon
Flora of Washington (state)
Flora of the Cascade Range
Flora of the Klamath Mountains
Flora of the Sierra Nevada (United States)
Natural history of the California chaparral and woodlands
Natural history of the California Coast Ranges
Natural history of the Peninsular Ranges
Natural history of the Transverse Ranges
Flora without expected TNC conservation status